Odessa is an unincorporated community in Clay County, West Virginia, United States. Its post office  is closed.

According to tradition, the community was named after the love interest of an early settler.

References 

Unincorporated communities in West Virginia
Unincorporated communities in Clay County, West Virginia
Charleston, West Virginia metropolitan area